The freguesias (civil parishes) of Portugal are listed in by municipality according to the following format:
 concelho
 freguesias

Gavião
Atalaia
Belver
Comenda
Gavião
Margem

Góis
Alvares
Cadafaz
Colmeal
Góis
Vila Nova do Ceira

Golegã
Azinhaga
Golegã

Gondomar
Baguim do Monte (Rio Tinto)
Covelo
Fânzeres
Foz do Sousa
Gondomar (São Cosme)
Jovim
Lomba
Medas
Melres
Rio Tinto
São Pedro da Cova
Valbom

Gouveia
Aldeias
Arcozelo
Cativelos
Figueiró da Serra
Folgosinho
Freixo da Serra
Gouveia (São Julião)
Gouveia (São Pedro)
Lagarinhos
Mangualde da Serra
Melo
Moimenta da Serra
Nabais
Nespereira
Paços da Serra
Ribamondego
Rio Torto
São Paio
Vila Cortês da Serra
Vila Franca da Serra
Vila Nova de Tazem
Vinhó

Grândola
Azinheira Barros e São Mamede do Sádão
Carvalhal
Grândola
Melides
Santa Margarida da Serra

Guarda
Adão
Albardo
Aldeia do Bispo
Aldeia Viçosa
Alvendre
Arrifana
Avelãs da Ribeira
Avelãs de Ambom
Benespera
Carvalhal Meão
Casal de Cinza
Castanheira
Cavadoude
Codesseiro
Corujeira
Faia
Famalicão
Fernão Joanes
Gagos
Gonçalo
Gonçalo Bocas
Guarda (São Vicente)
Guarda (Sé)
Jarmelo (São Miguel)
Jarmelo (São Pedro)
João Antão
Maçainhas de Baixo
Marmeleiro
Meios
Mizarela
Monte Margarida
Panoias de Cima
Pega
Pêra do Moço
Pêro Soares
Porto da Carne
Pousada
Ramela
Ribeira dos Carinhos
Rocamondo
Rochoso
Santana da Azinha
São Miguel da Guarda
Seixo Amarelo
Sobral da Serra
Trinta
Vale de Estrela
Valhelhas
Vela
Videmonte
Vila Cortês do Mondego
Vila Fernando
Vila Franca do Deão
Vila Garcia
Vila Soeiro

Guimarães
Abação (São Tomé)
Airão (Santa Maria)
Airão (São João Baptista)
Aldão
Arosa
Atães
Azurém
Balazar
Barco
Briteiros (Salvador)
Briteiros (Santa Leocádia)
Briteiros (Santo Estêvão)
Brito
Caldelas
Calvos
Candoso (Santiago)
Candoso (São Martinho)
Castelões
Conde
Costa
Creixomil
Donim
Fermentões
Figueiredo
Gandarela
Gémeos
Gominhães
Gonça
Gondar
Gondomar
Guardizela
Guimarães (Oliveira do Castelo)
Guimarães (São Paio)
Guimarães (São Sebastião)
Infantas
Leitões
Longos

Mascotelos
Mesão Frio
Moreira de Cónegos
Nespereira
Oleiros
Pencelo
Pinheiro
Polvoreira
Ponte
Prazins (Santa Eufémia)
Prazins (Santo Tirso)
Rendufe
Ronfe
Sande (São Clemente)
Sande (São Lourenço)
Sande (São Martinho)
Sande (Vila Nova)
São Faustino
São Torcato
Selho (São Cristóvão)
Selho (São Jorge)
Selho (São Lourenço)
Serzedelo
Serzedo
Silvares
Souto (Santa Maria)
Souto (São Salvador)
Tabuadelo
Urgezes
Vermil

G